This is a list of motorcycles produced by Benelli.

Motorcycle Models (incomplete)

Pre-World War II (1919–1940)

Post-World War II

Post De-Tomaso Era Bikes

Minicycle Models (incomplete)

Moped Models (incomplete)

See also
List of Bimota motorcycles
List of Moto Guzzi motorcycles

References

External links
 Benelli official website 
 Officine Benelli - Benelli Heritage 

 
Lists of motorcycles by brand